Viola betonicifolia, commonly known as the arrowhead violet, showy violet or mountain violet, is a small perennial of the genus Viola, which contains pansies and violets. It occurs from India and Pakistan in southern Asia throughout eastern Australia and Tasmania. It grows in shaded habitat in forests.

Taxonomy
English botanist Sir James Edward Smith was the first to describe Viola betonicifolia, giving it the common name "betony-leaved violet" in volume 37 of Rees's Cyclopædia in 1817. He noted that it was native to New South Wales. Spelling it Viola betonicæfolia in Flora Australiensis, George Bentham recognised it as the senior synonym of Viola longiscapa (DC.) G.Don and V. phyteumifolia G.Don.

Description
Flowers are followed by small pale brown pods with tiny blackish seeds.

Distribution and habitat
Viola betonicifolia is found in Tasmania and eastern mainland Australia from South Australia through Victoria and New South Wales, and into Queensland. It also occurs in Asia westwards to India and Pakistan. It grows in shady areas in forest.

Ecology
The caterpillars of the laced or Indian fritillary (Argynnis hyperbius) feed upon this plant, and the flowers are pollinated by the large- or common grass yellow (Eurema hecabe). Coastal swamps where Viola betonicifolia grows have been drained in New South Wales, endangering the status of the laced fritillary in that state.

Cultivation

Viola betonicifolia is an easy plant to grow, and adaptable to different soil types as long as it get sufficient moisture and at least half shade or more in a garden situation. It is good for rockeries. It can be quite vigorous in heavier, moisture retentive soils and forms clumps to about  diameter. It is self-seeding.

References

betonicifolia
Flora of the Indian subcontinent
Flora of New South Wales
Flora of Queensland
Flora of South Australia
Flora of Tasmania
Flora of Victoria (Australia)
Garden plants of Asia
Garden plants of Australia
Malpighiales of Australia
Plants described in 1817